Marko Momčilović (born 11 June 1987) is a Serbian professional footballer who plays as a defender for Dubočica.

Club career

Javor Ivanjica
After playing for Dubočica in the Serbian League East, Momčilović was transferred to newly promoted Serbian SuperLiga club Javor Ivanjica in the summer of 2008. He rarely played in his initial two seasons at the club (2008–2010), making just 10 league appearances. During the 2010–11 season, Momčilović became a first-team regular, scoring two goals in 29 league games. He would go on to establish himself as one of the league's best left-backs over the following years (2011–2013). Overall, Momčilović made 96 league appearances and scored four goals in his five seasons with the club.

Pandurii Târgu Jiu
In June 2013, Momčilović moved to Romania and signed a three-year contract with Liga I side Pandurii Târgu Jiu. He immediately became a first-team regular, making 31 league appearances and scoring four goals in his debut season at the club. Momčilović also played 12 matches in the 2013–14 edition of the UEFA Europa League, managing to score in a 1–1 group stage draw with Portuguese side Paços de Ferreira on 3 October 2013.

FCSB
On 12 January 2016, FCSB reached an agreement with Pandurii for the transfer of Momčilović, who signed a three-year contract with the club and was given the number 15 shirt. He was named in the Liga I Team of the Season in both 2016–17 and 2017–18. After struggling with injuries over the next two years, Momčilović left the club after his contract expired on 30 June 2020.

Career statistics

Honours

Club
FCSB
 Cupa Ligii: 2015–16

Individual
 Liga I Team of the Season: 2016–17, 2017–18

References

External links
 
 

1987 births
Living people
Sportspeople from Leskovac
Serbia and Montenegro footballers
Serbian footballers
Association football defenders
FK Radnički Beograd players
FK Dubočica players
FK Javor Ivanjica players
CS Pandurii Târgu Jiu players
FC Steaua București players
FK Radnički Niš players
FK Zlatibor Čajetina players
Serbian SuperLiga players
Liga I players
Serbian First League players
Serbian expatriate footballers
Expatriate footballers in Romania
Serbian expatriate sportspeople in Romania